Concepción Sánchez-Freire (Conchi Amancio) (born 28 September 1957) is a Spanish International, former football striker. She played for most of her career in Italy, winning seven national championships and 8 Italian Cups with Gamma 3 Padova, ACF Valdobbiadene, SS Lazio and GB Campania. She also played one year for Arsenal LFC in the FA Women's Premier League, after which she ended her career at 39.

Concepcion Sánchez also known as Conchi Amancio, was the first captain of the Spain national team in 1972. Following the foundation of the official Spain women's team. She was also the first professional Spanish footballer and one of the finest footballers of the world of all time. She was a footballer of pure class, powerfully smart and artistic, a striker of the ball with extraordinary milimetric assistances, she was able to change not only the tempo in any given match but also change the game altogether with magical displays of what the beauty of football is all about, a technician of the game, which laboratory was a football pitch, and the instrument with which she was delighted to play with, a delight to everyone lucky enough to see her playing, a true Super Star of the Women's game and Football Story in general.

She preferred to shorten her name to "Conchi" and was nicknamed "Amancio" after the male footballer Amancio Amaro.

Honours
 Serie A: 7
1973,1974, 1976, 1977, 1986–87, 1987–88, 1988–89
Italian Women's Cup: 7
1974, 1978, 1979, 1980, 1982–83, 1984–85, 1988–89

Italy Serie A women's champion with the Roma 3 Z (Futsal) 1992/93

( top scorer with 50 goals )

References

1957 births
Living people
Spanish women's footballers
Spain women's international footballers
Arsenal W.F.C. players
FA Women's National League players
S.S. Lazio Women 2015 players
Serie A (women's football) players
A.C.F. Trani 80 players
Women's association football forwards
A.C.F. Prato players
Expatriate women's footballers in England
Expatriate women's footballers in Italy
Spanish expatriate sportspeople in England
Spanish expatriate sportspeople in Italy